The 2016 Puerto Rico Republican presidential primary took place on March 6 in the U.S. territory of Puerto Rico as one of the Republican Party's primaries ahead of the 2016 presidential election.

While that day no other Republican primaries were held, the Democratic Party held their Maine caucuses. The Democratic Party's own Puerto Rico caucus took place on June 5.

Results

References

Puerto Rico
Republican
2016
March 2016 events in the United States